Lee Andrew McCutcheon  (born 6 July 1972 in Newcastle, Australia) is a competitive bodybuilder. He is a former International Federation of BodyBuilders (IFBB) professional bodybuilder and a current National Amateur Body-Builders' Association (NABBA) professional athlete.

Biography 

Lee Priest grew up in Wallsend, Australia. Priest's mother was also a bodybuilding competitor, and posed with Priest onstage. Priest started training at the age of 12 with the help and support of his grandfather. He competed for the first time at the age of 13 and won. He went on to win numerous other competitions leading up to him winning the IFBB Mr. Australia at 16 17, 18, and 19. Priest competed at the World's Championship at 17, where he placed 4th. At 19 he again competed and won The Mr. Australia title, but was not allowed to get his pro card in Australia because of his young age. It was then Priest decided to enter an amateur competition, Niagara Falls Championships. While there, Priest was discovered and given his pro card. Priest became one of the youngest men ever to turn IFBB pro at the age of 20.

Priest competed successfully within the IFBB for 16 years.  After falling shy of a notable championship, Priest set his sights on his most elusive opponent The Ironman Pro.  After ten years of coming in 2nd or 3rd, 2006 proved Priest's year as the Ironman Pro. 

In 2010 he was invited by Paul Dillett to compete in the WBFF, but due to the lack of competition, he decided against competing.

Priest is also an avid racing enthusiast and champion race car driver. He started racing in 2002 with road-racing and circle track. Priest then progressed to drag racing in 2004. He won numerous races and titles in road and circle track. His most successful bid came within drag-racing. He won Rookie of the Year in 2005. The following year, 2006, he won the SCEDA Racing Championship in Lancaster, California.

Following a seven-year absence from competitive bodybuilding, Lee Priest returned in 2013 to compete in the NABBA Mr Universe where he won the overall title as an amateur. He then appeared as a special guest at the 2014 Universe Championships while he was on tour in the UK.

Priest joined MuscleSport Magazine in November 2014 and began writing a monthly column online and in their print magazine. He was featured on the cover of their Winter 2015 issue.

He has a pet fox, named "Carlos".

Lee Priest starred in the 2018 horror short film Round Trip.

The Lee Priest Classic  
In 2014 NABBA International announced plans to hold a professional bodybuilding competition in Sydney, Australia, in partnership with the World Fitness Federation (WFF) International. This will be the first NABBA professional event held in Australia since the 1990 NABBA World Championships held in Geelong, Victoria. 

The Lee Priest Classic Australia 2015 was held on Sunday, 22 March 2015 at the Bankstown Sports Club in Sydney. The contest included both professional and amateur classes with overall male and female amateur class winners receiving a Pro Card from the World Fitness Federation. 

A second Lee Priest Classic event was held in the UK in conjunction with Muscle Promotions UK and sanctioned by WFF International. The Lee Priest Classic UK was held on Sunday, 19 July 2015 at The Cresset, Peterborough. The event offered classes for both amateurs and professionals.

Stats 
Name:  Lee Priest
Location:  Newcastle, Australia
Born:  6 July 1972
Height:  5’4" or 162 cm
Competition Weight:  196 - 205 lbs. (89 - 93 kg)
Arms: 22 inches (56 cm) (recorded that he has over 24 inches biceps while off season)
Chest: 58 inches
Waist: 30 inches
Quads: 30.5 inches

Contest history 

1986 School Boys Classic Sydney - 1st
1986 School Boys Newcastle Hunter Valley - 1st
1986 School Boys State Championships - 1st
1987 Dubbo Classic Men's Open - 3rd
1988 NSW State - 1st
1989 NSW State Titles - 1st
1989 WPF Mr. Australia - 1st
1989 AAU Mr. Universe - 2nd
1989 NSW Hunter Valley Couples - 1st
1989 IFBB Australian Championships - 1st
1990 IFBB Australian Championships - 1st
1990 IFBB World Amateur Championships, Lightweight - 4th
1993 IFBB Niagara Falls Pro Invitational - 9th
1994 IFBB Arnold Schwarzenegger Classic - 7th
1994 IFBB Ironman Pro Invitational - 4th
1994 IFBB Night of Champions - 12th 
1994 IFBB San Jose Pro Invitational - 7th
1995 IFBB Arnold Schwarzenegger Classic - 9th
1995 IFBB Florida Pro Invitational - 4th
1995 IFBB Ironman Pro Invitational - 3rd
1995 IFBB South Beach Pro Invitational - 4th
1996 IFBB Ironman Pro Invitational - 4th
1996 IFBB San Jose Pro Invitational - 6th
1997 IFBB Arnold Schwarzenegger Classic - 7th
1997 IFBB Grand Prix Czech Republic - 5th
1997 IFBB Grand Prix England - 6th
1997 IFBB Grand Prix Finland - 9th
1997 IFBB Grand Prix Germany - 3rd
1997 IFBB Grand Prix Hungary - 3rd
1997 IFBB Grand Prix Russia - 9th
1997 IFBB Grand Prix Spain - 3rd
1997 IFBB Ironman Pro Invitational - 2nd
1997 IFBB Mr. Olympia - 6th
1998 IFBB Mr. Olympia - 7th
1999 IFBB Iron Man Pro Invitational - 6th
1999 IFBB Mr. Olympia - 8th
2000 IFBB Night of Champions - 5th
2000 IFBB Mr. Olympia - 6th
2001 IFBB Ironman Pro Invitational - 7th
2002 IFBB Ironman Pro Invitational - 2nd
2002 IFBB Arnold Schwarzenegger Classic - 4th
2002 IFBB San Francisco Pro Invitational - 1st 
2002 IFBB Mr. Olympia - 6th
2003 IFBB Mr. Olympia - 15th
2004 IFBB Ironman Pro - 2nd
2004 IFBB San Francisco Pro Invitational - 2nd
2005 IFBB Grand Prix Australia - 1st
2005 IFBB Arnold Classic - 4th
2005 IFBB Iron Man Pro Invitational - 2nd
2006 IFBB Ironman Pro - 1st
2006 IFBB Arnold Classic - 6th
2006 IFBB Grand Prix Australia - 2nd
2006 NOC New York - 1st
2006 PDI Night of Champions - 1st
2013 NABBA Mr. Universe - 1st

Training videos 

The Blonde Myth (1998)
Another Blonde Myth (2001) - Footage leading up 2000 night of champions. "Home video footage" provides new look of Lee Priest. Includes his wedding, whole body workouts.
Training Camp and Career Highlights 
It's Not Revenge (2006) - In the series Titans, Bodybuilding Superstar Lee Priest trains a few days out of competition in Austin.
''Reality DVD series (2006–2008) BodybuildersReality.com

See also 
List of male professional bodybuilders

References

External links 
Lee Priest Competition history 

1972 births
Australian atheists
Australian bodybuilders
Living people
Professional bodybuilders
People from Newcastle, New South Wales